Avicenna Medical College (abbreviated as AMC), established in 2009, is a private college of medicine located on Bedian Road, DHA, Lahore, Punjab, Pakistan. It is registered with PMDC, listed in WHO Avicenna Directories and IMED, affiliated with UHS, and approved by Ministry of Health. Aadil Hospital and Avecinna Hospital are attached as training and teaching hospitals.

External links
  
 IMED profile

Medical colleges in Punjab, Pakistan